Sir Robert Crichton-Brown KCMG CBE TD (23 August 191911 July 2013) was an Australian businessman best known as chairman of Rothmans International during the 1980s.

He was also Treasurer of the Liberal Party of Australia between 1974 and 1989. He was a keen yachtsman, competing in the Sydney to Hobart Yacht Race many times: he was the skipper of the Pacha, winner of the 1970 race. He was the National Chair for the Duke of Edinburgh's International Award - Australia from 1979 to 1984.

Honours
Crichton-Brown was appointed a Commander of the Order of the British Empire (CBE) in 1970.  He was made a Knight Bachelor in 1972, and made a Knight Commander of the Order of St Michael and St George (KCMG) in 1980.

References

1919 births
2013 deaths
Australian businesspeople
Australian male sailors (sport)
Liberal Party of Australia
Australian Knights Commander of the Order of St Michael and St George
Australian Knights Bachelor
Australian Commanders of the Order of the British Empire
British Army personnel of World War II